The Bernard H.V.40 was a racing seaplane designed by Société des Avions Bernard for the French government to compete in the 1929 Schneider Trophy.

Design and development
The H.V.40 and H.V.41 were two designs ordered for use by the French team in the 1929 Schneider Trophy. The H.V.40 was designed by Georges Bruner and was similar to the Bernard 20 landplane fighter. It was a streamlined single-seat cantilever monoplane and had two metal floats attached underneath the fuselage on inverted vee-struts. The H.V.40 was to powered by a Gnome-Rhône 9Kfr Mistral radial engine. The aircraft was ready for testing by May 1929 but due to delays with the engine it did not fly and the French government withdrew the team from the 1929 race.

Originally designed to produce  the Mistral never achieved the required power output and the H.V.40 did not fly until July 1931. The first flight was from Lake Berre the base of the French team for the 1931 race. The H.V.40 flew well but had poor high-speed performance and was only used for a number of training flights.

Specifications

See also

References

Notes

Bibliography

1930s French sport aircraft
Schneider Trophy
Floatplanes
HV040
Single-engined tractor aircraft
Low-wing aircraft
Aircraft first flown in 1931